The St. Clair Region Conservation Authority is a conservation authority in the province of Ontario. It is headquartered in Strathroy, Ontario. The conservation authority's jurisdiction covers all of the waterways that feed into the St. Clair River.

The authority was established in 1961 to help clean up the environment.

Protected areas
 A.W. Campbell Conservation Area
 Bridgeview Conservation Area
 C. J. McEwen Conservation Area
 Centennial Park, Strathroy, Ontario
 Clark Wright Conservation Area
 Coldstream Conservation Area
 Crothers Conservation Area
 Esli Dodge Conservation Area
 Highland Glen Conservation Area
 Keith McLean Conservation Lands
 Lambton County Heritage Forest
 Lorne C. Henderson Conservation Area
 Marthaville Habitat Management Area
 McKeough Conservation Area
 Moore Habitat Management Area
 Peers Wetland
 Perch Creek Habitat Management Area
 Shetland Conservation Area
 Strathroy Conservation Area
 Sydenham River Canoe Race Start
 Warwick Conservation Area
 Wawanosh Conservation Area

External links 
 St. Clair Region Conservation Authority

St. Clair River
Lambton County
Strathroy-Caradoc
Middlesex County, Ontario
Conservation authorities in Ontario
1961 establishments in Ontario